Kathleen O'Connor Ives (born July 1977) is an American attorney and former Democratic politician from the Commonwealth of Massachusetts.

Career
In 2007, O'Connor Ives became a member of the Newburyport City Council.

In 2012, she was elected to Massachusetts Senate representing the 1st Essex District, which encompasses Amesbury, Haverhill, Merrimac, Newburyport, Methuen, Salisbury, and portions of North Andover. She won a competitive election, defeating former Methuen mayor Bill Manzi and Haverhill resident Tim Coco in the Democratic primary, and two Haverhill school committeemen- Republican Shaun Toohey and independent Paul Magliocchetti- in the general election.

In 2014, Ives ran for a second term. She handily dispatched Jessica Finnochiaro of Methuen in the Democratic primary, and bested Toohey in a rematch in the general election. Ives won a third term in 2016, beating Adele Martino of Haverhill in the primary and facing no general election opposition. 

She chaired the Post Audit and Oversight Committee. In March 2018, she announced that she would not seek re-election.

Early life and education
Kathleen O'Connor Ives graduated from Mount Holyoke College, magna cum laude, in 1999 with her Bachelor of Arts in Environmental Politics and International Relations. She later received her Juris Doctor and Environmental Law Certificate, cum laude, from Pace University School of Law in 2007.

References

External links
Member Profile. Massachusetts General Court.
Massachusetts Senate Campaign Site

1977 births
Living people
Massachusetts Democrats
Politicians from Newburyport, Massachusetts
Pace University School of Law alumni
Mount Holyoke College alumni
Massachusetts city council members
Women state legislators in Massachusetts
21st-century American politicians
21st-century American women politicians
Women city councillors in Massachusetts